Hallgarten is a quarter of Oestrich-Winkel, Hesse, Germany.  It lies within the Rheingau wine region.

Its church, dedicated to the Assumption of Mary, is a venue of the Rheingau Musik Festival.

References

Villages in Hesse
Rheingau-Taunus-Kreis
Rheingau